Anqiu is a county-level city under the jurisdiction of Weifang in the south of Shandong province, China.

The population at the 2010 census was 926,900 even though the built-up area is much smaller.

Part of the Great Wall of Qi begins here, and is listed on the People's Republic of China's list of historical artifacts.

Administrative divisions
As 2012, this city is divided to 2 subdistricts and 11 towns.
Subdistricts
Xing'an Subdistrict
Xin'an Subdistrict

Towns

Climate

References

External links
 Information page

Cities in Shandong
Weifang